Essop Moosa (born 1952/1953), nicknamed Smiley and also known as Arthur Williams, is a South African former soccer player and racing commentator.

Early and personal life
Moosa's paternal grandfather was from Surat in Gujarat, British India. Under South Africa's apartheid race laws, Moosa was classified as "Indian", although his father was classified as "White" and his mother as "Coloured". His younger brother Zane was also a footballer. Moosey was nicknamed "Smiley".

Playing career
Moosa played for Sundowns at the age of 16. In November 1972 he appeared in a Cup competition between two teams from the whites-only National Football League, representing Berea Park, playing under the pseudonym Arthur Williams. After the opposing team Rangers became suspicious, and journalists investigated and revealed his real identity, he was visited by the Special Branch and told not to "try it again". By doing so he became the first non-white player to play for an all-white team in South Africa.

Moosa later said that the incident and others under apartheid sent him to a psychiatric hospital for a time.

In the mid-1970s Moosa had a trial in England with Crystal Palace, and was offered a contract by West Ham United, but failed to gain a work permit for the transfer.

Moosa was voted the SA Football Federation's Player of the Year, for three consecutive years – 1972, 1973, and 1974.

In addition to Sundowns and Berea Park, Moosa also played for Swaraj, Bluebells, Durban Aces, Adriatica, Benoni United, and Pretoria Callies.

Commentating career
Moosa later worked as a racing commentator, coming out of retirement in June 2018 following a 15-year absence.

Sources

References

1950s births
Living people
South African soccer players
Mamelodi Sundowns F.C. players
Berea Park F.C. players
Association football wingers
South African people of Gujarati descent
Horse racing writers and broadcasters
Pretoria Callies F.C. players